Pelagia Natsvlishvili (died 1878), was a Georgian physician. 

She became the first female physician in Georgia in 1878.

References

19th-century births
1878 deaths
Physicians from Georgia (country)

Year of birth unknown